Charles Doyle Leffler 'Uncle Charlie' (August 12, 1868 - April 27, 1939) was a shop owner, banker and politician in the U.S. state of Florida.  He was the City of Miami's 10th Mayor.

Early Life 
Son of a Confederate Army NCO, Leffler was born in Smithland, Kentucky.  The Leffler family came to Florida in 1877 and Leffler spent his childhood in the city of Sanford. He served in the Gate City Rifles from the Orange County battalion of the Florida State Troops around the time of the Spanish-American War but the war ended before he was scheduled to be sent to Cuba.

Philanthropic and civic activities
Leffler was active in the Rotary Club.

See also 

 List of mayors of Miami
 Government of Miami
 History of Miami

References
Notes
  
Bibliography
 The Miami Herald; Charles D Leffler Mayor of the City of Miami; June 20, 1922; Page 1A
 The Miami Herald; Leffler Rites are Conducted; April 30, 1939; Page 10A

External links 
 HistoryMiami official website of HistoryMiami (formerly the Historical Museum of Southern Florida)

 
1868 births
1939 deaths
Mayors of Miami
Florida Democrats